Teachers 3: New Term is the official soundtrack, on the Channel 4 label, of the third series of British television comedy-drama series Teachers.

This album contains music by various artists, heard in the show itself.

Track listing
 "Come Back Around" by Feeder
 "The Bitter End" by Placebo
 "Evening of the Day" by Supergrass
"Beautiful" by Athlete
 "Fractions and Feeling" by Stephen Malkmus
 "Natalie and Nucy" by Papa Garcia
 "Pack It In" by Kid Galahad
 "Up the Bracket" by The Libertines
 "Get Free" by The Vines
 "You Got My Number" by The Jeevas
 "A Modern Way of Letting Go" by Idlewild
 "I Live for Speed" by Star Spangles
 "Good to Me" by Brendan Benson
 "Jerk It Out" by Caesars
 "Stuck on the Street at Minus Ten" by Basement
 "Take It Off" by The Donnas
 "Bigger Wheels" by I Am Kloot
 "21st Century Rip Off" by Soundtrack of Our Lives

External links
 Listen to samples at Last.fm
 Teachers: New Term at Play.com
 New Term on Amazon

Television soundtracks
2002 soundtrack albums